Karolina, Karolína or Karolīna is a feminine given name. Karolina is a Croatian, Danish, Faroese, Finnish, German, Hungarian, Lithuanian, Macedonian, Norwegian, Polish, Russian, Slovene, and Swedish name. Karolína is a Czech, and Icelandic name that is a form of Karolina and Carolina and a diminutive form of Karola and Carola. Karolīna is a Latvian name. Notable people with the name include the following:

Given name

Arts, Music & Literature
Karolina (singer), professional name of Keren Karolina Avratz, Israeli singer
Karolina Adamczyk (born 1975), Polish actress
Karolina Bock (1792 – 1872), Swedish dancer, actress and singer
Karólína Eiríksdóttir (born 1951), Icelandic composer
Karolina Gočeva (born 1980), Macedonian singer
Karolina Gruszka (born 1980), Polish actress
Karolina Halatek (born 1985), Polish artist
Karolina Kuiek, known as Ani Lorak (born 1978), Ukrainian singer, songwriter, actress, entrepreneur
Karolína Kurková (born 1984), Czech model
Karolina Laskowska, British fashion designer
Karolina Lewicka Polish director, writer and producer
Karolína Mališová (born 1996), Czech model and beauty pageant titleholder
Karolina Nowakowska (born 1982), Polish actress, dancer and vocalist
Karolina Pavlova (1807 – 1893), Russian poet and novelist
Karolina Proniewska (1828–1859), Lithuanian poet and translator
Karolina Slunéčková, (1934 – 1983), Czech actress
Karolína Světlá (1830 – 1899), Czech author
Karolina Wydra (born 1981), Polish model and actress
Karolina Zakrzewska, Polish beauty pageant contestant

Economics
Karolina Ekholm (born 1964), Swedish economist

Medical
Karolina Widerström, (1856 – 1949), Swedish doctor and gynecologist

Historical figures
Karolina Lanckorońska (1898 — 2002), Polish noble, resistance fighter, and historian
Karolina of Legnica-Brieg (1652 – 24 December 1707 in Wrocław), Silesian noble
Karolina Sobańska (1795 – 1885), Polish spy and noblewoman

Politics
Karolina Gajewska (born 1972), Polish politician
Karolina Kaczorowska (born 1930), Polish First Lady
Karolina Pawliczak (born 1976), Polish lawyer and politician
Karolína Peake (born 1975), Czech politician
Karolina Skog (born 1976), Swedish politician
Karolina Stallwood, British executive

Religion
Karolina Gerhardinger,(1797 – 1879), German Roman Catholic sister
Karolina Kózka (1898 – 1914), Polish Roman Catholic

Sports
Karolina Arewång-Höjsgaard (born 1971), Swedish orienteering competitor
Karolína Bednárová (born 1986), Czech volleyball player
Karolina Bochra (born 1988), Polish footballer
Karolina Bosiek (born 2000), Polish speed skater
Karolina Chrapek (born 1990), German alpine skier
Karolina Chlewińska (born 1983), Polish fencer
Karolína Elhotová (born 1992), Czech basketball player
Karolína Erbanová (born 1992), Czech speed skater
Karolina Ericsson (born 1973), Swedish badminton player
Karolina Fotiadou (born 1970), Cypriot alpine skier
Karolina Goliat (born 1996), Belgian volleyball player
Karolína Grohová (born 1990), Czech cross-country skier
Karolina Hájková (born 1997), Slovak swimmer
Karolina Jagieniak (born 1979), Polish tennis player
Karolina Jarzyńska (born 1981), Polish long-distance athlete
Karolina Jovanović (born 1988), Serbian tennis player
Karolina Karasiewicz (born 1992), Polish cyclist
Karolina Karlsson (born 1966), Swedish tennis player
Karolina Kedzierska (born 1987), Swedish Taekwondoist
Karolina Kochaniak (born 1995), Polish handball player
Karolina Kołeczek (born 1993), Polish hurdling athlete
Karolina Konieczna, Polish cyclist
Karolína Kosinová (born 1998), Czech ice hockey player
Karolina Kosińska (born 1986), Polish tennis player
Karolina Kowalkiewicz (born 1985), Polish mixed martial artist
Karolina Kucharczyk (born 1991), Polish Paralympic athlete
Karolina Kudłacz-Gloc (born 1985), Polish handball player
Karolina Michalczuk (born 1979), Polish boxer
Karolína Muchová (born 1996), Czech tennis player
Karolina Naja (born 1990), Polish sprint canoer
Karolina Nowak (born 1999), Polish gymnast
Karolina Pahlitzsch (born 1994), German athlete
Karolina Pęk Polish para table tennis player
Karolina Pelendritou (born 1986), Cypriot paralympic swimmer
Karolína Pilařová, Czech curler
Karolína Plíšková (born 1992), Czech tennis player
Karolina Podgórska (born 1987), Polish darts player
Karolina Riemen (born 1988), Polish freestyle skier
Karolina Sadalska (born 1981), Polish sprint canoer 
Karolina Semeniuk-Olchawa (born 1983), Polish handball player
Karolina Sevastyanova (born 1995), Russian gymnast
Karolina Siódmiak (born 1981), Polish handball player
Karolina Sklenyte (born 1996), Lithuanian gymnast
Karolina Šprem (born 1984), Croatian tennis player
Karolína Stuchlá (born 1994), Czech tennis player
Karolina Styczyńska (born 1991), Polish shogi player
Karolina Szabó (born 1961), Hungarian long-distance athlete
Karolina Szczepaniak (born 1992), Polish swimmer
Karolina Sztokfisz (born 1989), Polish snowboarder
Karolina Szwed-Orneborg (born 1989), Polish handball player
Karolina Tymińska (born 1984), Polish heptathlete
Karolina Urban, Canadian women’s ice hockey player
Karolina Westberg (born 1978), Swedish footballer
Karolina Wisniewska (born 1976), Polish para-alpine standing skier
Karolina Wlodarczak (born 1987), Australian tennis player
Karolina Zalewska (born 1984), Polish handball player

Others
Karolina Andriette Nobel (1803 – 1889), Swedish woman and mother of Alfred Nobel
Karolina Bielawska (born 1999), Polish model and beauty pageant titleholder who was crowned Miss World 2021
Karolina Lassbo (born 1980), Swedish blogger
Karolina Olsson, Swedish woman who hibernated for three decades
Karolina Wigura (born 1980), Polish sociologist, historian and journalist

Nickname
Karolina Ramqvist, nickname of Annika Virtanen Ramqvist (born 1976), Swedish journalist and author

Middle name 
Maria Josefa Karolina Brader (1860 - 1943), Swiss Roman Catholic religious sister
Anna Karolina Orzelska (1707 – 1769), Polish noblewoman
Ludwika Karolina Radziwiłł (1667 – 1695), Princess of the Grand Duchy of Lithuania
Anna Karolína Schmiedlová (born 1994), Slovak tennis player
Maria Karolina Sobieska (1697 – 1740), Polish noblewoman
Elin Karolina Svensson (1879–??), Swedish missionary

Fictional characters
Karolina Dean, a Marvel Comics member of the Runaways
Karolina Novotney, head of PR for Waystar/Royco on the HBO series Succession

See also

Carolina (name)
Karoliina
Karolin (name)
Karoline

Notes

 Croatian feminine given names
 Czech feminine given names
 Danish feminine given names
 Faroese feminine given names
 Finnish feminine given names
 German feminine given names
 Hungarian feminine given names
 Icelandic feminine given names
 Latvian feminine given names
 Lithuanian feminine given names
 Macedonian feminine given names
 Norwegian feminine given names
 Polish feminine given names
 Russian feminine given names
 Slovene feminine given names
 Swedish feminine given names